Chandon Lamar Sullivan (born August 7, 1996) is an American football cornerback for the Minnesota Vikings of the National Football League (NFL). He played college football at Georgia State.

College career
Sullivan was a four-year starter for the Georgia State Panthers, appearing in 49 games and starting 44 of them. Over the course of his career, he set school records for interceptions (7) and pass breakups (25) and finished fifth in career tackles (182). As a senior, Sullivan became the first player in Georgia State history to be invited to the Senior Bowl as well as the team's first Academic All-American.

Professional career

Philadelphia Eagles
Sullivan signed with the Philadelphia Eagles as an undrafted free agent on April 28, 2018. He failed to make the Eagles' 53-man roster out of training camp, but was subsequently signed to the team's practice squad on September 2. Sullivan was promoted to the active roster on October 25, 2018, after defensive end Derek Barnett was placed on injured reserve. Sullivan made his NFL debut on October 28, 2018, against the Jacksonville Jaguars, playing on special teams. Sullivan made his first career start on November 25, 2018, against the New York Giants, he made three tackles and deflected a pass before leaving the game due to injury. He was waived by the Eagles on December 24, 2018, and re-signed to the practice squad for the rest of the season and signed a reserve/future contract with the Eagles on January 14, 2019. In his rookie season, Sullivan played in five games (one start) and made seven tackles. He was waived on May 1, 2019.

Green Bay Packers
On May 6, 2019, Sullivan signed with the Green Bay Packers and made the team out of training camp. In week 5 against the Dallas Cowboys, Sullivan intercepted a pass from Dak Prescott in the 34–24 win. Sullivan played in all 16 of the Packers' regular season games and recorded 30 tackles with six passes defended, one interception, and one forced fumble while also playing in both of the team's playoff games with one start. On March 17, 2020, the Packers tendered Sullivan for one year as an exclusive rights free agent. He signed the tender on April 27, 2020.

On September 20, 2020, against the Detroit Lions Sullivan intercepted a pass thrown by Matthew Stafford on the Lions' seven-yard line and returned it for his first career touchdown during the 42–21 win.

The Packers placed a restricted free agent tender on Sullivan on March 17, 2021. He signed the one-year contract on April 23.

Minnesota Vikings
On March 25, 2022, Sullivan signed a one year contract with the Minnesota Vikings.

NFL career statistics

Regular season

Postseason

References

External links
Minnesota Vikings bio
Georgia State Panthers bio

1996 births
Living people
People from Winder, Georgia
Sportspeople from the Atlanta metropolitan area
Players of American football from Georgia (U.S. state)
American football cornerbacks
Georgia State Panthers football players
Philadelphia Eagles players
Green Bay Packers players
Minnesota Vikings players